Tatul Island is a triangular ice-free island off the north coast of Robert Island in the South Shetland Islands, Antarctica.  Extending , the island emerged as a distinct geographical entity following the retreat of Robert Island's ice cap in the late 20th and early 21st century.

The feature is named after the settlement of Tatul adjacent to a major Thracian shrine complex in the Rhodope Mountains, Bulgaria related to the cult of Orpheus.

Location
Bulgarian early mapping in 2009.

See also 
 Composite Antarctic Gazetteer
 List of Antarctic islands south of 60° S
 SCAR
 Territorial claims in Antarctica

Maps
 L.L. Ivanov. Antarctica: Livingston Island and Greenwich, Robert, Snow and Smith Islands. Scale 1:120000 topographic map.  Troyan: Manfred Wörner Foundation, 2009.

References

External links 
 Tatul Island. SCAR Composite Antarctic Gazetteer
 Bulgarian Antarctic Gazetteer. Antarctic Place-names Commission. (details in Bulgarian, basic data in English)

External links
 Tatul Island. Copernix satellite image

Islands of Robert Island
Bulgaria and the Antarctic